Joshua K. Adams (born 10 December 1986) is an Australian Dancesport competitor. Adams also has two older brothers, Paul and Michael who were successful Ballroom Dancers.

Career
Adams is a two time National Dancesport Champion dancing with longtime dance partner Jessica Reid, both who were trained by successful Dancesport instructor Michael Bishop in Brisbane Queensland.

References

External links 

1986 births
Living people
Australian male dancers
Queensland University of Technology alumni
Australian ballroom dancers
21st-century Australian dancers